The year 1688 in music involved some significant events.

Events
 Ferdinando de' Medici, Grand Prince of Tuscany, hired Bartolomeo Cristofori as his keeper of musical instruments.

Published popular music
Lilliburlero in popular circulation

Classical music
John Blow – Ode for New Year's Day
Marc-Antoine Charpentier  
Magnificat à 4 voix sans instruments, H.76
Dixit Dominus H.202
Gottfried Finger – 12 Sonatas for Diverse Instruments, Op.1
Johann Philipp Krieger – O Jesu, du mein Leben
Henry Purcell – A Fool's Preferment, Z.571
André Raison – 
Johann Schenck – Tyd en Konst-Oeffeningen, Op.2
Daniel Speer 
Philomela angelica cantionum sacrarum
Musikalisch-türkischer Eulenspiegel
Giuseppe Torelli – 12  for Violin and Cello, Op. 4, published in Bologna
Giovanni Buonaventura Viviani – Salmi, Mottetti e Litanie della B. V. a 1. 2. 3. voci
Johann Jakob Walther –

Opera
Marc-Antoine Charpentier – David et Jonathas
Johann Philipp Förtsch – Die heilige Eugenia
Jean-Louis Lully – Zephire et Flore
Henry Purcell – Dido and Aeneas Z.626
Philidor André Danican l'aine – Le Mariage de la grosse Cathos

Births
April 15 – Johann Friedrich Fasch, composer (died 1758)
October 17 – Domenico Zipoli, composer (died 1726)
date unknown
Zacharias Hildebrandt, organ builder (died 1777)
Lorenzo Sornis, violinist

Deaths
January 8 – Francesco Foggia, composer (b. 1604)
January 29 – Carlo Pallavicino, Italian composer (b. c. 1630)
May 14 – Carlo Grossi, composer (born c. 1634)
November 26 – Philippe Quinault, librettist for many operas of Jean-Baptiste Lully (born 1635)
date unknown – Anne Chabanceau de La Barre (born c. 1628)

 
17th century in music
Music by year